Rib Mountain, also known as Rib Hill, is a glacially-eroded monadnock in central Wisconsin, located in the Town of Rib Mountain in Marathon County. Composed of quartzite covered with a softer syenite sheath, it was intruded about 1.5 billion years ago.

Rib Mountain is near Wausau on the west side of the Wisconsin River, just west of Interstate 39 and just south of Highway 29.

The Rib River and Little Rib River are nearby.

Rib Mountain is home to the Rib Mountain State Park and the Granite Peak Ski Area. The peak is also the site of transmitters for radio and TV stations in the Wausau area, and is the namesake for Wisconsin Public Television's WHRM-TV (Channel 20) and WHRM-FM (90.9), Wisconsin Public Radio's news and classical network station for the area.

It also makes room for the transmitter at the top for WDEZ.

Local legend states that the "ribs" in Rib Mountain denote that it is the burial site of Paul Bunyan. The nearby Mosinee Hill is said to be the grave of Babe the Blue Ox.

When the ski area opened on the slopes of Rib Mountain in 1937, it was one of the first ski areas in North America. Stowe Mountain Resort in Vermont had opened a few years earlier in 1934. Sun Valley in Idaho had become the nation's first ski area in the western states in 1936.

References

External links
 Rib Mountain State Park
 Friends of Rib Mountain State Park
 A Geological History of Rib Mountain

Hills of Wisconsin
Inselbergs of North America
Landforms of Marathon County, Wisconsin
Mountains of Wisconsin